Saint-Pierre-de-Bressieux (literally Saint-Pierre of Bressieux) is a commune in the Isère department in southeastern France.

Geography
The Galaure forms part of the commune's southern border.

Population

See also
Communes of the Isère department

References

Communes of Isère
Isère communes articles needing translation from French Wikipedia